Jirapa is one of the constituencies represented in the Parliament of Ghana. It elects one Member of Parliament (MP) by the first past the post system of election. Jirapa is located in the Jirapa/Lambussie District of the Upper West Region of Ghana.

Boundaries
The seat is located entirely within the jirapa district of the Upper West Region of Ghana.

Members of Parliament

Elections

 
 
 

 
 
 

7 April 2009 - Edward Salia NDC died after a period of illness necessitating the by-election. Dr. Francis Bawaana Dakurah of the NDC won the seat with a majority of 9,337 (59.0%) beating the NPP candidate and immediate past District Chief Executive, Justin Bayelah Dakurah to second place.

See also
List of Ghana Parliament constituencies

References 

Parliamentary constituencies in the Upper West Region